Jules Patient (January 15, 1905 in Cayenne, French Guiana – July 27, 1985 in Cayenne) was a politician from French Guiana who served in the French Senate from 1948 to 1952.

References 
 page on the French Senate website

French people of French Guianan descent
French Senators of the Fourth Republic
French Guianan politicians
People from Cayenne
1905 births
1985 deaths
Senators of French Guiana